Eresina likouala is a butterfly in the family Lycaenidae. It is found in the Republic of the Congo. Its habitat consists of dense, primary forests.

References

Endemic fauna of the Republic of the Congo
Butterflies described in 1962
Poritiinae